Thriveni is a 1970 Indian Malayalam-language film,  directed by A. Vincent and produced by C. V. Sridhar via Chitralaya, the company's only film in the language. The film stars Sathyan, Prem Nazir, Sharada, Savita G. Thampi and Kaviyoor Ponnamma. The film's music was composed by G. Devarajan. Sathyan selected the old man's role at his peak of stardom just because of the importance of the role. Sharada got Kerala State Best Actress Award for this film.

Plot

Cast 
Sathyan as Damodaran Muthalali
Prem Nazir as Shivaraman
Sharada as Thankamma
Kaviyoor Ponnamma as Parvathy
KPAC Lalitha as Janaki
Adoor Bhasi as Purushu
Thikkurissy Sukumaran Nair as Padmanabhan
Sankaradi
Alummoodan
 Kedamangalam Ali
 Raghava Menon
 Abbas
Paravoor Bharathan as Mathai
Savita G. Thampi as Shivaraman's son

Soundtrack 
The music was composed by G. Devarajan, with lyrics by Vayalar Ramavarma.

Box office 
The film was a commercial success.

References

External links 
 

1970 films
1970s Malayalam-language films
Films directed by A. Vincent